This is a list of Anglo-Catholic churches in England.

In May 2014, the House of Bishops' Declaration on the Ministry of Bishops and Priests declared that "the Church of England is fully and unequivocally committed to all orders of ministry being open equally to all, without reference to gender". They also acknowledged that "those within the Church of England who, on grounds of theological conviction, are unable to receive the ministry of women bishops or priests continue to be within the spectrum of teaching and tradition of the Anglican Communion", and therefore that "the Church of England remains committed to enabling them to flourish within its life and structures." To this end, "Pastoral and sacramental provision for the minority within the Church of England will be made."

Those Anglo-Catholic parishes in the Church of England that reject the ordination of women can request alternative episcopal oversight (AEO) from a traditionalist bishop. Within the Province of Canterbury, the Anglo-Catholic provincial episcopal visitors (PEV) are the Bishop of Richborough (currently Norman Banks), the Bishop of Oswestry (currently Paul Thomas), and the Bishop of Fulham (currently Jonathan Baker). In the Diocese of Chichester, however, the Bishop of Chichester is both diocesan bishop and the provider of AEO. Within the Province of York, the Anglo-Catholic PEV is the Bishop of Beverley (currently Stephen Race). In two dioceses of the province, AEO is provided by a suffragan bishop: the Bishop of Wakefield (Tony Robinson) in the Diocese of Leeds, and the Bishop of Burnley (Philip North) in the Diocese of Blackburn.

Province of Canterbury
Anglo-Catholic churches in the Province of Canterbury of the Church of England.

Diocese of Bath and Wells

Diocese of Birmingham

Diocese of Bristol

Diocese of Canterbury

Diocese of Chelmsford

Diocese of Chichester

Diocese of Coventry

Diocese of Derby

Diocese of Ely

Diocese of Exeter

Diocese of Europe

Diocese of Gloucester

Diocese of Guildford

Diocese of Hereford

Diocese of Leicester

Diocese of Lichfield

Diocese of Lincoln

Diocese of London

Diocese of Norwich

Diocese of Oxford

Diocese of Peterborough

Diocese of Portsmouth

Diocese of Rochester

Diocese of Salisbury

Diocese of Southwark

Diocese of St Albans

Diocese of St Edmundsbury and Ipswich

Diocese of Truro

Diocese of Winchester

Diocese of Worcester

Province of York
Anglo-Catholic churches in the Province of York of the Church of England.

Diocese of Blackburn

Diocese of Carlisle

Diocese of Chester

Diocese of Durham

st aidans and st Columbia church anglo catholic oxford rd and Stockton road hartlepool ts

Diocese of Leeds

Diocese of Liverpool

Diocese of Manchester

Diocese of Newcastle

Diocese of Sheffield

Diocese of Sodor and Man

Diocese of Southwell and Nottingham

Diocese of York

See also

 Liberal Anglo-Catholicism
 Affirming Catholicism
 :Category:Anglo-Catholic church buildings in England

References

Anglo-Catholicism
Anglo-Catholic churches in England
Anglo-Catholic churches in England